is a passenger railway station located in the city of Mima, Tokushima Prefecture, Japan. It is operated by JR Shikoku and has the station number "B17".

Lines
Only local trains stop at the station.

Layout
The station consists of an island platform serving 2 tracks. A siding branches off track 1 and ends in a large vehicle shed near the station building. Access to the island platform is by means of a footbridge. The station ticket window is unstaffed but there is a ticket vending machine. In addition, a shop near the station sells some types of tickets as a kan'i itaku agent.

Platforms

Adjacent stations

History
With the privatization of Japanese National Railways (JNR), the successor to JGR, on 1 April 1987, Oshima came under the control of JR Shikoku. On 1 June 1988, the line was renamed the Tokushima Line.

Surrounding area
Oshima Bridge

See also
 List of Railway Stations in Japan

References

External links

 JR Shikoku timetable

Railway stations in Tokushima Prefecture
Railway stations in Japan opened in 1914
Mima, Tokushima